The 2015 ICC Europe Division One was a cricket tournament held in Jersey from 9–13 May 2015. The tournament was organised by ICC Europe, and featured the top six associate members in that region – Denmark, France, Guernsey, Italy, Jersey, and Norway. Ireland, the Netherlands, and Scotland had already qualified for the World Twenty20 Qualifier, while England qualify for the World Twenty20 automatically.

The host, Jersey, won the tournament on net run rate from Denmark, its first title. The leading runscorer at the tournament was Danish batsman Freddie Klokker, while the leading wicket taker was Italian bowler Carl Sandri. By winning the tournament, Jersey qualified for the 2015 World Twenty20 Qualifier in Ireland and Scotland. The top six teams at that tournament, where matches will have full Twenty20 status, will qualify for the 2016 ICC World Twenty20 in India.

Squads
Squads for the tournament were announced on 27 April 2015.

Preparation
Jersey's preparation for the tournament consisted of three twenty-over fixtures against Dutch teams, all played at the VRA Ground in Amstelveen in late April. They defeated a Netherlands A side by 62 runs, and then played matches against the two Dutch sides in the North Sea Pro Series, defeating the Hurricanes by 68 runs and losing to the Seafarers by seven wickets. Similarly, France's preparation included twenty-over fixtures against the Hurricanes and the Seafarers, both played on 2 May at Sportpark Maarschalkerweerd, Utrecht. They defeated the Hurricanes by 14 runs, and lost to the Seafarers in a super over, necessitated after an initial tie.

Denmark, coached by former Irish international Jeremy Bray, played several fixtures in Ireland in mid-April. They lost to the Irish under-19 side by seven wickets and lost both games against Leinster Lightning, but did win a fixture against The Hills Cricket Club by seven runs. Guernsey, coached by former South African international Nic Pothas, attended a training camp at the County Ground, Hove, and subsequently played fixtures against a Sussex County Cricket Club academy team and a Sussex Cricket League representative team.

Points table

Matches

Statistics

Most runs
The top five run scorers (total runs) are included in this table.

Source: CricHQ

Most wickets

The top five wicket takers are listed in this table, listed by wickets taken and then by bowling average.

Source: CricHQ

Final standings

ICC Europe World Cricket League Division Six Qualifier

Along with the Twenty20 tournament, two teams, France and Norway played each other in one-off 50-over match for a qualification spot in 2015 ICC World Cricket League Division Six.

References

External links
 Series home at ESPN Cricinfo

Europe Division One
ICC Europe Division One
ICC Europe Division One
ICC Europe Division One
ICC Europe Division One